Gribov, a village in Slovakia.
 Alexey Gribov, Russian actor
 Boris Gribov, Russian chemist
 Vladimir Gribov, Russian theoretical physicist
 Gribov ambiguity, an issue in theoretical physics named after Vladimir Gribov

See also
 Gribow, a municipality in Germany